Sri Lanka Railways M6 is a class of 16 Diesel-electric locomotives imported to Sri Lanka in 1979. Manufactured by Thyssen-Henschel in Kassel, West Germany, under licence from Electro-Motive Division of the United States. Most are still in service. Very successful in upcountry line, since it has Flexicoil truck (bogies) and dynamic brakes. Loco numbers 793 and 798 engines were destroyed by LTTE terrorists. M6 790 was involved in the Watawala landslip incident.

These locomotives were originally imported for use on flat terrain but they are very successful in upcountry line.  Its flexicoil bogies and dynamic brakes allow it to perform well in the upcountry.  Therefore, the M6 fleet is frequently used in upcountry line.

Liveries 
M6 locomotives are painted either in standard livery or the class' unique ICE (InterCity Express) livery.  The standard livery features horizontal green, brown and yellow strips.  The ICE livery is brown and orange, a livery that is only painted on locomotives 785, 788, 797.  No. 792 used to be in ICE livery in the 1990s, but has since been repainted in standard livery.

Accidents and incidents 
Loco numbers 793 and 798 were destroyed by terrorist attacks (793 was destroyed by a bomb blast between Puliyankulam-Vavniya on March 25, 1986; 798 was destroyed by a bomb blast at Thambalagamuwa on December 5, 1996). Loco number 786 was involved in the Yangalmodara level crossing accident.

References 

Sri Lanka Diesel Locomotive Data Pages

M06
Railway locomotives introduced in 1979
5 ft 6 in gauge locomotives